Ikram Butt (born 25 October 1968) is an English former professional rugby league footballer who played in the 1980s and 1990s.

Background
Ikram Butt's birth was registered in  Leeds, West Riding of Yorkshire, he was the first south Asian to play either code of international rugby for England in 1995.

Whilst with the London Broncos, he was convicted of perverting the course of justice and spent three months in prison as a result of a driving misdemeanour.

He is the founder of the British Asian Rugby Association, and the British Pakistani rugby league team.

In 2002-3 Ikram joined grass-roots side Victoria Rangers ARLFC for three seasons. During this time he showed he hadn't lost any of his skill from his professional days, The main reason for joining the Vics was to link up with Nigel Goodings who had formed a successful team at Victoria Rangers.

In 2009 Ikram released an autobiography called Tries and Prejudice. The book has sold close to 1,000 copies with more still to be sold, he gave all the proceeds to charity. The book's foreword is written by Bollywood star Rahul Bose.

He currently works for Leeds Rugby as a Manager of the connecting communities project, as Sports Campaign Manager as a consultant for White Ribbon Campaign, and is vice president of "World Rugby League"

Playing career

Club career

Ikram Butt made his début for Featherstone Rovers on Sunday 26 August 1990, and he played his last match for Featherstone Rovers during the 1994–95 season.

Butt played , i.e. number 2, in Featherstone Rovers' 20-16 victory over Workington Town in the 1992–93 Division Two Premiership Final at Old Trafford, Manchester on Wednesday 19 May 1993.

In 1995, Butt joined the London Broncos, and played their inaugural Super League season, he later joined Huddersfield Giants in 1997 before playing his final season as a professional player at Hunslet Hawks in 1998.

International honours
Ikram Butt won a cap for England while at Featherstone Rovers in 1995 against Wales, and in doing so he became the first South Asian to play for England rugby league.

He also captained Pakistan in their first ever match on 30 November 2011.

Genealogical information
Ikram Butt is the brother of the rugby league footballer who played in the 1980s for Leeds and Featherstone Rovers (Heritage № 595); Tony Butt.

References

1968 births
Living people
British sportspeople of Pakistani descent
England national rugby league team players
English people of Pakistani descent
English rugby league players
Featherstone Rovers players
Huddersfield Giants players
Hunslet R.L.F.C. players
Leeds Rhinos players
London Broncos players
Pakistan national rugby league team captains
Pakistan national rugby league team players
People educated at Lawnswood School
People from Leeds
Rugby league players from Leeds
Rugby league wingers